Carl Maria Splett (17 January 1898 – 5 March 1964) was a German Roman Catholic priest and Bishop of Danzig (Gdańsk); his role during World War II, especially as apostolic administrator of the Diocese of Culm, is controversial. After World War II he was put on trial and imprisoned in Poland for his alleged collaboration with the Nazi regime, and later deported to West Germany.

Early life
Splett was born in Zoppot (Sopot) to the teacher and later vice-president of the Free City of Danzig's Parliament (Volkstag), Franz Splett. He attended school in Konitz (Chojnice), Neustadt (Wejherowo) and Danzig (Gdańsk), where he passed his Abitur in 1917. Splett studied Theology and Philosophy at the Seminary of the Diocese of Kulm in Pelplin, where he also learned Polish. He was ordained on 10 July 1921 and after graduating at Pelplin he was sent to Rome for further studies, especially in Canon law, and practiced at the Sacra Rota Romana.

Splett returned to Danzig in 1924 and became a vicar at several congregations within the then Apostolic Administration of Danzig (elevated to diocese in 1925). He was further promoted to cathedral capitular of Oliva in 1935. According to Czesław Madajczyk, Splett had close relations with Nazi Albert Forster, and pursued plans to replace Polish clergy with German ones. Bolesław Kumor claims he provided Forster with housing when the Nazi official first arrived in the city, and Forster in return supported Splett politically; as a result Splett enjoyed full support from the Nazi party. Forster praised Splett's work for Nazis saying, "This is my man, I can fully rely on his work"

Splett succeeded Edward O'Rourke as the head of the Roman Catholic Diocese of Danzig in 1938. While the Nazis, who ruled the Free State of Danzig since 1933, tried to install their own candidate Paul Schütz as successor of Bishop O'Rourke, Splett was appointed as bishop by the pope. Splett also refused to appoint Schütz as vicar general as demanded by the local Nazis. Zofia Waszkiewicz claims he was supported by Nazi Forster who became his protector.

Splett himself on 20 April 1939 ordered churches to ring bells celebrating Hitler's 50th birthday as well as ordering prayers on his behalf.

World War II

Splett held the position as Bishop of Danzig also after the German annexation of the Free City during World War II. On 4 September, Splett issued a letter to churches where he praised the German invasion of Poland and Nazi annexation of the city, and recommended his flock to pray for God's blessing on Adolf Hitler. Immediately after the invasion, the Nazi gauleiter  Albert Forster demanded the Vatican appointment of  Splett as Apostolic Administrator of the Diocese of Culm. The Polish bishop Wojciech Okoniewski was forced to flee in the face of the Nazi invasion and his auxiliary Konstantyn Dominik was interned by Nazis. The Vatican had its doubts, but Pope Pius XII on 6 December 1939 agreed to the Nazi demands. His appointment was protested by the Polish Government in Exile as a violation of a concordat signed with Rome.  Splett had close relations to Nazi Albert Forster, who praised Splett's work for Germany. Splett replaced Polish clergy with Germans, introducing 200 German priests into the Chełmno diocese where he took office from December 1939. After the invasion of Poland seven of the twelve Polish priests and four German priests of his diocese were murdered,. Under his reign Polish priesthood was oppressed and prayers and Masses under his direction praised Hitler. He also issued a ban against use of the Polish language in churches. When he banned confessions in Polish in May 1940, the Vatican intervened and ordered that the ban be lifted. Not only did Splett defend his ban, he argued it was to "protect" people making the confessions. After this argument he tried to claim that confessions in Polish are used for "nationalistic means". Eventually the Vatican accepted his explanation. Besides banning the Polish language, Splett ordered removal of Polish signs and names in cemeteries from monuments and graves and in all churches under his jurisdiction. When a family asked him to save three imprisoned Polish priests in Stuthoff camp he told them that "Polish priests are no apostles but traitors."

Bohdan Pietka states that Splett through his obedient and servile attitude towards Nazis not only led to the destruction of Polish religious life in the city but also by his indifferent attitude contributed to brutal extermination of Polish clergy and plunder of Polish churches.

According to Samerski, several parishes were seized and after Splett initially refused to prohibit the usage of Polish in his diocese another six Priests were arrested by the Gestapo, which forced him to ban the usage of Polish in his Diocese in April/May 1940.

According to Dieter Schenk, on 5 September 1939 Splett protested against the arrest of Catholic priests and in February 1940 Splett sent a list of Catholic priests who were victims of persecution after the German invasion of Poland to the Reichskanzlei, the German Red Cross, the Wehrmacht High Command, the Reichssicherheitshauptamt, and the Gauleitung. Peter Raina points out that the priests Splett sought to protect were mostly of German ethnicity and not Polish. Schenk stresses that Splett did not collaborate but bowed to the murderous pressure of the Nazis, while Peter Raina disputes that he was under any pressure or danger, and states that Splett's actions were done in full awareness.

On 8 October 1940 the Nazi Gauleiter Albert Forster praised  Splett stating that he "continues to fulfill all my wishes and orders".

In October 1942 Splett wrote to Field Marshal Goering a letter in which he declared himself a "German bishop" and stated his willingness and dedication to the spread of German culture to all churches in his diocese. In the letter he listed efforts made by him to pursue Germanization of Polish territories and boasted that by doing this he "fulfilled to no end his duty as a German bishop."

Post World War II

Trial in Poland
He remained in Gdansk after the Soviet Union occupied the city in March 1945 and was arrested by the Red Army on 25 March 1945, but soon released. He continued administering to the remaining Catholic inhabitants, who had not escaped, as well as the newly arriving Polish settlers.. In the beginning of August 1945 Polish Cardinal August Hlond requested Splett to resign from his position, which Splett refused to do. On 9 August Splett was arrested by Polish officials and put on trial for collaboration and oppression of the Polish People. The trial involved 36 people out of which 22 were priests and 4 nuns

Stefan Samerski reports that throughout custody Hlond pretended Pope Pius XII had disbanded Splett, which was not the case. Hlond criticised Splett's refusal to resign as the Catholic Church in Poland was in conflict with communist authorities; Splett's decision gave ammunition against the Church. He was sentenced to eight years in prison on 1 February 1946 and imprisoned at Wronki Prison. After his release from prison, Splett was kept under domiciliary arrest at Stary Borek in Southern Poland and at the monastery of Dukla.

Robert Żurek, Deputy director of the Polish Center of Historical Research in Berlin, regards this as a show trial and part of the anti-catholic policy of the Polish government after World War II. Its aim was to portray the papal policy as anti-Polish, since the Vatican had entrusted a Polish diocese to a "German chauvinist". Żurek stresses that in a statement of 16 January 1946 even  the Polish Bishop of Katowice, Stanisław Adamski, emphasized Splett's merits regarding pastoral care in occupied Poland. Adamski pointed out that Splett acted under massive pressure from the Gestapo and that the Nazis attempted to make the bishop appear as the initiator of their anti-Polish policy. Despite the pressure of Polish authorities, all Catholic priests interrogated as witnesses made exculpatory testimonies.

Polish officials were however not actually interested in the background of Splett's actions. The real intention of the trial was to justify the termination of the Concordat of 1925 by the Polish authorities and to segregate the Polish Catholic Church from the Vatican.

Historian Peter Raina states that the trial was fair and Splett was allowed to defend himself freely and without any difficulties nor obstructions and extensively. For Raina it was not a show trial, and the guilt of Splett was evident; he would get the same verdict if placed under trial at Nuremberg. Jan Zaryn writes that although the attack on Splett were often insulting, they were not without merit due to his servile attitude toward the Gestapo Professor Jerzy Serczyk writes that due to Splett's anti-Polish actions during the war there was hardly any disapproval in Polish society towards sentencing Splett

Later life in West Germany

In 1956, after protests from West Germany and by the Polish Primate Cardinal Stefan Wyszynski, the new Polish government allowed his emigration to West Germany. He remained official Bishop of Danzig until his death in 1964 and was active in pastoral care for the expelled population of Danzig. 
Upon his return he sought contact and worked with the "Bund der Danziger", an organization of Germans formerly living in Gdansk that demanded annexation of the Polish city as well as "evacuation of Poles from our homeland". A publication Splett was engaged with in West Germany was Unser Danzig (Our Gdansk), in which Splett published in 1958 that the German right to Polish territories is supported by the pope himself. According to German historian Dieter Schenk, both 'Bund der Danziger and "Unser Danzig" served as shelter for many former Nazi activists and officials post war.

He played an active role in the improvement of the German-Polish relations throughout the Second Vatican Council.

The administrative position of the bishop of Gdańsk was held by lesser church officials. He was succeeded by Edmund Nowicki, his coadjutor bishop since 1956.

Splett died in Düsseldorf.

References

External links
 Splett in 1960

1898 births
1964 deaths
20th-century German Roman Catholic bishops
Participants in the Second Vatican Council
People from West Prussia
People from Sopot
People from the Free City of Danzig
German people of World War II
20th-century German Roman Catholic priests